Elisa Uga (born 27 February 1968) is an Italian former fencer. She won a silver medal in the women's team épée event at the 1996 Summer Olympics.

References

External links
 
 

1968 births
Living people
Italian female fencers
Olympic fencers of Italy
Fencers at the 1996 Summer Olympics
Olympic silver medalists for Italy
Olympic medalists in fencing
People from Vercelli
Medalists at the 1996 Summer Olympics
Fencers of Fiamme Oro
Sportspeople from the Province of Vercelli
20th-century Italian women
21st-century Italian women